Holly Ann Winkeljohn Brady (born August 14, 1969) is a United States district judge of the United States District Court for the Northern District of Indiana.

Biography 

Brady earned her Bachelor of Arts from Indiana University at Bloomington and her Juris Doctor from the Valparaiso University School of Law.

Career 

After graduating from law school, Brady worked as an associate in the labor law firm of Gallucci, Hopkins & Theisen from 1994 to 1998. The firm merged with Barnes & Thornburg in 1998, and she continued on with that firm's labor and employment litigation section until 2002. From 2002 to 2007, she was a member at Theisen, Bowers, & Brady.

From 2007 to 2019, when she became a district judge, Brady was a member in the Fort Wayne law firm of Haller & Colvin, where she focused her practice on civil, employment, and labor litigation. She was president of the firm from 2012 to 2018.

Federal judicial service 

On April 10, 2018, President Donald Trump nominated Brady to serve as a United States District Judge of the United States District Court for the Northern District of Indiana. She was nominated to the seat vacated by Judge Joseph S. Van Bokkelen, who assumed senior status on September 29, 2017. On June 6, 2018, a hearing on her nomination was held before the Senate Judiciary Committee. On June 28, 2018, her nomination was reported out of committee by a 11–10 vote.

On January 3, 2019, her nomination was returned to the President under Rule XXXI, Paragraph 6 of the United States Senate. On January 23, 2019, President Trump announced his intent to renominate Brady for a federal judgeship. Her nomination was sent to the Senate later that day. On February 7, 2019, her nomination was reported out of committee by a 12–10 vote. On April 10, 2019, the Senate invoked cloture on her nomination by a 56–43 vote. Later that day, she was confirmed by a 56–42 vote. She received her judicial commission on April 16, 2019.

Recognition 

Each year since 2013, Brady has been recognized in The Best Lawyers in America for labor and employment law. She is involved in numerous community organizations and has served on the Northern District of Indiana Federal Community Defenders Board of Directors and as Vice President of the Fort Wayne Sexual Assault Treatment Center.

References

External links 
 

1969 births
Living people
20th-century American lawyers
21st-century American lawyers
21st-century American judges
Indiana lawyers
Indiana University Bloomington alumni
Judges of the United States District Court for the Northern District of Indiana
People from Fort Wayne, Indiana
United States district court judges appointed by Donald Trump
Valparaiso University School of Law alumni
20th-century American women lawyers
21st-century American women lawyers
21st-century American women judges